Edilberto Algredo Jaramillo (born 13 February 1957) is a Mexican politician affiliated with the PRD. He currently serves as Deputy of the LXII Legislature of the Mexican Congress representing Tlaxcala.

References

1957 births
Living people
People from Tlaxcala
Party of the Democratic Revolution politicians
21st-century Mexican politicians
Deputies of the LXII Legislature of Mexico
Members of the Chamber of Deputies (Mexico) for Tlaxcala